The Argo Electric Vehicle Company was an electric automobile manufacturer that operated in Saginaw, Michigan, United States, from 1912 to 1916. The Argo Electric used a 60 volt system with Westinghouse motors. It had 6 forward and 6 reverse speeds, had 36 x 4 cushion tires and used an  steering wheel on the left. They were offered in both four- and five-passenger models, with open and closed versions available, and all models used steering wheels. The  wheelbase was the longest of any electric at the time.

By 1914 Argo joined with the Broc and Borland Electric vehicle companies to form the American Electric Car Company. Three different models were marketed. In 1916 the Columbia Motors Company purchased the assets of Argo.

See also
Brass Era car
History of the electric vehicle

References

Further reading

External links 
 Electric Vehicle History article.
 Picture of 1912 Argo Brougham

Defunct motor vehicle manufacturers of the United States
Motor vehicle manufacturers based in Michigan
Electric vehicles introduced in the 20th century
Defunct companies based in Michigan
Vehicle manufacturing companies established in 1912
Saginaw, Michigan
Columbia Motors
1912 establishments in Michigan
Vehicle manufacturing companies disestablished in 1916
1916 disestablishments in Michigan